No. 14 Squadron ( or LLv.14, from 3 May 1942 Le.Lv.14), later renamed No. 14 Reconnaissance Squadron (Finnish: Tiedustelulentolaivue 14 or TLe.Lv.14 on 14 February 1944), was a reconnaissance squadron of the Finnish Air Force during World War II. The squadron was part of Flying Regiment 1 during the Winter War and Flying Regiment 5 during the Continuation War.

Organization

Winter War
1st Flight (1. Lentue)
2nd Flight (2. Lentue)
3rd Flight (3. Lentue)

The equipment consisted of 5 Fokker C.Xs, 7 Fokker C.VEs, and 7 Gloster Gladiator IIs.

Continuation War
1st Flight (1. Lentue)
2nd Flight (2. Lentue)
3rd Flight (3. Lentue)
3rd Flight of No. 30 Squadron (3./Le.Lv.30)

The equipment consisted of 14 Morane-Saulnier MS.406s, 3 Fokker D.XXIs, 2 Westland Lysanders, 1 Fokker C.V, and 1 Fieseler Fi 156.

Bibliography

External links
Lentolaivue 14

14